Marko Mirgorodský (born 4 November 1998) is a Slovak slalom canoeist who has competed at the international level since 2013. He competes in the C1 event.

Mirgorodský won two medals in the C1 team event at the ICF Canoe Slalom World Championships with a silver in 2022 and a bronze in 2021. He also won a silver medal in the C1 team event at the 2018 European Championships, alongside Michal Martikán and Alexander Slafkovský.

He is once World U23 Champion (2017) and twice World Junior Champion (2015 & 2016)

He competed in the Boys' C1 Obstacle Canoe Slalom at the 2014 Youth Olympic Games in Nanjing, winning a bronze medal.

Results

Complete World Cup results

References

External links

1998 births
Living people
Slovak male canoeists
Canoeists at the 2014 Summer Youth Olympics
Sportspeople from Liptovský Mikuláš
Medalists at the ICF Canoe Slalom World Championships